General Rollo may refer to:

Andrew Rollo, 5th Lord Rollo (1703–1765), British Army brigadier general
Bill Rollo (fl. 1970s–2010s), British Army lieutenant general
Hamish Rollo (1955–2009), British Army major general